Babrungas (Samogitian: Babrungs) is a village in the Plungė district municipality, Lithuania. It is located on the bank of Babrungas River.

Babrungas is an administrative center of Babrungas eldership.

As of 2011, there were 612 inhabitants living in this village.

References

Villages in Telšiai County
Plungė District Municipality